= List of ambassadors of Turkey to Sudan =

The list of ambassadors of Turkey to Sudan provides a chronological record of individuals who have served as the diplomatic representatives of the Republic of Turkey to Republic of the Sudan. During the 2023 Sudan conflict, the ambassador's car came under attack, however no one was hurt.

== List of ambassadors ==
Ambassador	Term start	Term end	Ref.
İrfan Neziroğlu	1 November 2017	3 September 2022	
İsmail Çobanoğlu	9 November 2022	Present	
